Jody Tolan (born 5 October 1977) is a Northern Irish former semi-professional footballer.

Playing career

Cliftonville
Tolan began playing for Cliftonville in the middle of the 1990s, making his Irish League debut against Coleraine in November 1996. Under manager Marty Quinn, Tolan was a member of the Cliftonville team to which Quinn brought success. They won the County Antrim Shield, the Coca-Cola Cup and brought the Irish League to Solitude after they finished ahead of favourites Linfield and took the trophy from their bitter rivals Crusaders. Tolan became one of Cliftonville's top players that season, but subsequently left the club to follow Quinn to Coleraine .

Coleraine
Tolan was reunited with former Quinn and a few other players from The Reds. Tolan enjoyed further success at Coleraine under Quinn, just as he had at Cliftonville. In 2003, Tolan scored the winning goal in the Irish Cup final against favourites Glentoran. He also won a number of other trophies under Quinn. He left the club in 2005 to join Glentoran.

Later career
Tolan only made a handful of appearances for Glentoran due to several injuries. He returned for a few games for manager Roy Coyle before agreeing to a loan deal with newly promoted side Donegal Celtic. He initially announced his retirement in October 2006 . He managed only nine appearances for DC before returning to Coleraine in 2007. Tolan retired from football in 2010 and is now living in Coleraine with wife Lisa.

References

External links
Walk The Chalk

1977 births
Living people
Association footballers from Northern Ireland
Cliftonville F.C. players
Coleraine F.C. players
Glentoran F.C. players
Donegal Celtic F.C. players
NIFL Premiership players
Association football forwards